Armageddon Through Your Speakers is the major label debut of rap metal band Bionic Jive.

Track listing 

 "Who's Your God, Pt. 1"
 "Shut 'Em Down"
 "Pump"
 "I Shot Lucifer"
 "Hands to the Roof"
 "Swarm"
 "Break the Chains"
 "Freaks"
 "Rock On"
 "Ricochet"
 "Get It Hot" (spoken word skit)
 "Kerosene"
 "Walking With Shadows"
 "Goodbye"
 "Who's Your God, Pt. 2"

Personnel 

 Ako Mack - lead vocals
 Emerg McVay - lead vocals
 Larry "Luv" Elyea - guitar
 Richard "Cunni" Gartner - bass guitar
 Chris "TGI" Elsner - drums

References

2001 albums
Bionic Jive albums